Spirit is an American media franchise owned by DreamWorks Animation, which began with the 2002 animated film Spirit: Stallion of the Cimarron written by John Fusco from an idea by producer Jeffrey Katzenberg. The franchise follow the adventures of a Kiger Mustang stallion named Spirit.

The first film, Stallion of the Cimarron, received mostly positive reviews from critics and was nominated for the Academy Award for Best Animated Feature at the 75th Academy Awards.

A computer-animated television series, Spirit Riding Free, premiered on Netflix in 2017 and introduced new characters like Lucky Prescott, who became one of the franchise main protagonist alongside Spirit. It spawned a short-form series titled Pony Tales, a spin-off series titled Riding Academy, and two television specials.

The television series also served as the basis for the 2021 film Spirit Untamed, which is a re-imagined version of the  first episode Spirit Riding Free.

Films

Spirit: Stallion of the Cimarron (2002) 

Spirit: Stallion of the Cimarron is a 2002 American animated adventure film produced by DreamWorks Animation and distributed by DreamWorks Pictures. It was directed by Kelly Asbury and Lorna Cook, in their feature directional debuts, from a screenplay by John Fusco.

The film follows Spirit, a Kiger Mustang stallion (voiced by Matt Damon through inner dialogue), who is captured during the American Indian Wars by the United States Cavalry; he is freed by a Native American man named Little Creek who attempts to lead him back into the Lakota village.

The film was released in theaters on May 24, 2002. In July 2014, the film's distribution rights were purchased by DreamWorks Animation from Paramount Pictures (owners of the pre-2005 DreamWorks Pictures catalog) and transferred to 20th Century Fox before reverting to Universal Studios in 2018.

Spirit Untamed (2021) 

Spirit Untamed is an 2021 American computer-animated adventure film produced by DreamWorks Animation and distributed by Universal Pictures. The film is directed by Elaine Bogan, in her feature directorial debut, and co-directed by Ennio Torresan Jr..

It is a spin-off and a stand-alone sequel of the traditional animated film Spirit: Stallion of the Cimarron and based on its spin-off television series Spirit Riding Free, created by Aury Wallington, who also co-wrote the screenplay with Kristin Hahn. The film is a re-imagined version of the series story that follows a young girl named Fortuna "Lucky" Prescott who moves to the small rural community of Miradero, where she meets the titular wild kiger mustang she names "Spirit" and immediately begins to bond with him.

The film was released in the United States on June 4, 2021.

Television series

Spirit Riding Free (2017–2019) 

Spirit Riding Free is a computer-animated spin-off television series, produced by DreamWorks Animation Television based on the traditionally animated film, Spirit: Stallion of the Cimarron. Created by Aury Wallington, it premiered on Netflix on May 5, 2017.

The series is set in small frontier town of Miradero and follow Lucky Prescott, a 12-year-old girl who had recently relocated from the city. She encounters a wild kiger mustang named Spirit. Lucky immediately bonds with the stallion and also makes friends with Pru Granger and Abigail Stone. Pru owns a palomino horse called Chica Linda, and Abigail a pinto horse called Boomerang. The girls call themselves the PALs.

Webisodes (2017-2019) 

A number of webisodes have been released exclusively (except for "Unstoppable Music Video") on the DreamWorks Spirit YouTube-channel during the course of the series.

Spirit Riding Free: Pony Tales (2019) 
Spirit Riding Free: Pony Tales is a computer-animated short-form television series, produced by DreamWorks Animation Television and the second spin-off television series of Spirit: Stallion of the Cimarron and the first from the first television series Spirit Riding Free. It premiered on Netflix on August 9, 2019.

Spirit Riding Free: Riding Academy (2020) 
Spirit Riding Free: Riding Academy is a computer-animated, produced by DreamWorks Animation Television and the third spin-off television series of Spirit: Stallion of the Cimarron and the second from the television series Spirit Riding Free. It premiered on Netflix on April 3, 2020.

Lucky, Pru and Abigail are preparing to leave Miradero as they move away to boarding school at the Palomino Bluffs Riding Academy. But the girls are faced with fresh responsibilities and experiences. From meeting their new competition, the BUDs, their transition to the academy is anything but easy. Along the way the PALs will make new friends and explore their individual talents as they grow up and discover their new home together.

Spirit & Friends (2022) 
On February 9, 2022, DreamWorks announced a new series Spirit & Friends inspired by the characters from Spirit Riding Free, which takes place in the same setting of Spirit Untamed. It begin release on YouTube on February 12. The cast trio of Spirit Untamed (Merced, Martin, and Grace) reprised their roles and all shorts were directed by Andrew Wilson with animation provided by Doberman Pictures and Top Draw Animation. The series was also released on Peacock months later after the release.

Television specials

Spirit Riding Free: Spirit of Christmas (2019) 
Spirit Riding Free: Spirit of Christmas is a Christmas special which premiered on Netflix on December 6, 2019. The special starred the characters from Spirit Riding Free television series.

Lucky and her friends embark on a Christmas Eve adventure into the city to find the perfect gift, but their return to Miradero for the holiday festivities are ruined when an avalanche derails their plans.

Spirit Riding Free: Ride Along Adventure (2020) 
Spirit Riding Free: Ride Along Adventure is a interactive special which premiered on Netflix on December 8, 2020.

In this special, Lucky and her friends go on a mission to save Maricela's beloved mare, Mystery, from greedy horse thieves who've taken her captive with a wild herd.

Cast and crew

Cast and Characters

Crew

Reception

Box office performance

Critical and public response

Video games

Music

Soundtracks

Singles

References

External links 
 

Spirit: Stallion of the Cimarron
DreamWorks Animation franchises
Film franchises
Television franchises
American film series
Children's film series
Animated film series
Adventure film series
Horses in film and television